Longmanhill is a Bronze Age long barrow situated atop a prominent rounded landform in northern Aberdeenshire, Scotland near Banff Bay. Due to the low-lying coastal plain characteristics, the elevation of Longmanhill affords a long-distance view as far as the Moray Firth.

Nearby is the village of Longmanhill.

See also
 B9031 road
 Burn of Myrehouse
 Cairn Lee
 Catto Long Barrow

References

Mountains and hills of Aberdeenshire